Robert Paige (born John Arthur Paige, December 2, 1911 – December 21, 1987) was an actor and a TV newscaster and political correspondent and Universal Pictures leading man who made 65 films in his lifetime: he was the only actor ever allowed to sing on film with Deanna Durbin (in 1944's Can't Help Singing).

Early life 
Born in Indianapolis, Indiana in 1911, Paige was related to Admiral David Beatty, hero of the World War I Battle of Jutland.

Education 
Contrary to some accounts, Paige was not a graduate of West Point. There were only three graduates of the U.S. Military Academy by the name of Paige, and this actor was not one of them. This has been verified by the USMA Register of Graduates.

Career 
Paige began his screen career in 1934, initially billed as David Carlyle to avoid confusion with another rising leading man, John Payne. His handsome features and assured speaking voice earned him prominent roles in motion pictures, such as Cain and Mabel with Clark Gable and Marion Davies. He worked primarily for Warner Brothers and Republic Pictures during this period. 

In 1938 he signed a contract with Columbia Pictures, which changed his screen name to Robert Paige. Columbia cast him in "B" features and starred him in one serial, Flying G-Men. These were action pictures that didn't capitalize on his singing voice; when Columbia did allow him to sing, it was to supply uncredited vocals for other male stars. (He dubbed for Charles Starrett in the 1938 college musical Start Cheering.) When the Columbia contract lapsed, Paige moved to Paramount Pictures for one year, and appeared in seven feature films, the most noteworthy being the horror film The Monster and the Girl (1941).

Robert Paige finally found a home in 1941 at Universal Pictures, where he quickly became one of the studio's reliable stars. He played romantic leads in many Universal comedies and musicals, including those of Abbott and Costello, Olsen and Johnson, Gloria Jean, and Hugh Herbert, as well as numerous B-musicals, often paired with another singer, Jane Frazee. Many of Paige's performances displayed a flair for comedy, lending his romantic roles a breezy charm. He may be best remembered today for his heroic leading role in the classic 1943 horror film Son of Dracula. Paige left Universal after a corporate shakeup in 1946, when the studio temporarily abandoned its program of light entertainments in favor of serious, artistic films. (Paige would return to Universal years later for one more feature, reuniting with Abbott and Costello in their science-fiction comedy Abbott and Costello Go to Mars.)

Paige became an independent film producer in 1947 and entered the new field of television. He was the last permanent host of NBC's variety series The Colgate Comedy Hour, and won an Emmy in 1955 for "Best Male Personality" (a category that no longer exists). In the 1960s, he became a TV newscaster in Los Angeles at KABC-TV, Channel 7.

Paige continued to work in occasional films through 1963; his last two films were The Marriage-Go-Round (1961) and Bye Bye Birdie (1963). From 1966 to 1970 Paige was a newscaster and political correspondent for ABC News in Los Angeles. He left the news desk to become Deputy Supervisor of Los Angeles under Baxter Ward, and then moved into the public relations field. He retired in the late 1970s.

Death 
Robert Paige died from a sudden aortic aneurysm in 1987. He was 76 years old.

Spouses 

 Maxine Hoppe (1985–1987; his death)
 Joanne Ludden (1962–1980; divorce); 1 child
 Betty Henning (1940–1960; divorce)

Children 
His only child, born when he was in his late 50s, is daughter Colleen Paige, a pet and home lifestyle expert, author, designer and the founder of National Dog Day, and many more philanthropic holidays. She currently resides in Los Angeles, California with her family and a menagerie of pets.

Filmography

References

External links 
 
 

1911 births
1987 deaths
American male film actors
American game show hosts
Male actors from Indianapolis
Deaths from aneurysm
Place of death missing
Paramount Pictures contract players
20th-century American male actors